"I do not choose to run" was a statement made by U.S. president Calvin Coolidge to the press on August 2, 1927, on his decision not to run for the 1928 presidential election. The statement was ambiguous, and led to considerable debate as to the intentions of its language.

Background 
Coolidge was at his "Summer White House" in the Black Hills when he gave his secretary, Everett Sanders, a piece of paper that said, "I do not choose to run for president in 1928." Sanders endorsed Coolidge's declaration, and the announcement was scheduled for the 9 a.m. press conference on Tuesday August 2, 1927.

However, to avoid an overreaction by the stock market on the east coast, the announcement was moved to midday. At 11:30, Coolidge cut out strips of paper with his statement on it, and at the conference, handed each reporter a strip. Without providing any further information, Coolidge remarked, "There will be nothing more from this office today."

Reaction

Public 
Upon Coolidge's announcement, the gathered media were stunned. The public, too, were shocked by the announcement. Many felt Coolidge could easily win a second full term, based on "Coolidge Prosperity", the booming economy, and a surplus of over $300 million.

Family and colleagues 
As early as 1924, Coolidge had made it clear he would not run again after his 1924 campaign. He relayed this to his father after his son Calvin Jr., died. After the election, Theodore Roosevelt Jr. "clearly remembered" Coolidge mentioning his desire not to run again, a conversation Coolidge also reportedly had with Frank Stearns at the same time. Also, Secret Service Agent Edmund Starling, who served at the White House for thirty years, and protected five presidents, recounted that Coolidge decided "long ago" not to run again for office.

While some close to Coolidge knew he would not run for another term, others were stunned by his announcement, including Sanders, his personal secretary. Later in the day on August 2, Grace Coolidge found out of her husband's announcement from visiting senator Arthur Capper. She remarked, "Isn't that just like the man. He never gave me the slightest intimation of his intention. I had no idea."

Reasons for the statement 
After Coolidge's announcement there was much debate as to what he meant in his choice of words. Some took the language as a definitive statement that he was not willing to be president any longer. Others thought that he was hoping to be drafted by the party as a candidate.

Hope to be drafted 
Some close to the president took the view that Coolidge was looking to be drafted by the party for the 1928 election. Vice President Charles G. Dawes believed that he "ardently" wanted the nomination. Commerce secretary Herbert Hoover, himself considering a 1928 election bid, asked Coolidge if his decision was "absolutely conclusive", and the president made no direct reply. Even one of Coolidge's closest friends, Senator William M. Butler, said of the decision, "I do not know what he wants."

As for being drafted as the party's candidate, Coolidge stated that he "was determined not to have that contingency arise."

Desire for private life 

Others saw Coolidge's message as a desire to get back to private life. As early as 1924, Coolidge decided he would not run for the presidency a second time. The death of his son, Cal Jr., in 1924, took a heavy toll on the president, which some say led to clinical depression. "When he died, the power and the glory of the Presidency went with him", Coolidge later wrote in his autobiography. He also noted that another term would put him in the White House longer than any other man had been there, and ten years is more time than any man should spend there.

Also, Coolidge took some steps to make sure he was not drafted for the nomination. He said, "I do not approve the circulation of a petition, such as has been reported in the morning press, requesting me to run for president in 1928. I don't see that anything good could come from it. I hope it will be discontinued." He also announced in December 1927, "My statement stands. No one should be led to suppose that I have modified it. My decision will be respected." Informed that some Massachusetts Republicans were mounting a campaign to have him win their state's presidential primary, Coolidge informed the Republican state chairman "Such an action would be most embarrassing to me… I request that it not be done."

While the language was open for debate, some pointed out that it was the language of a Vermont Yankee. "The Yankee language is founded on understatement and not overstatement," said publisher Charles Thompson.

Honoring two-term tradition 
Within the Republican party, there was talk that the "no third term tradition" could damage Coolidge's, and thus the party's, chances come election day. This led to some party members calling for him not to run for a third term (or in this case, second elected term), though most scholars feel their opinion had little effect on Coolidge's reasoning. At the time, the Twenty-second Amendment was not a part of the Constitution and thus the "two term tradition" was not a firm limit but rather a constitutional convention. There had only been one previous instance of a former vice president winning even one election in his own right after succeeding to the Presidency, this being when Theodore Roosevelt was re-elected in 1904 after succeeding the assassinated William McKinley. However, Roosevelt had served nearly all of McKinley's second term, which may have influenced his decision not to run again in 1908, although he did run unsuccessfully in 1912 against his successor, William Howard Taft.

By contrast, Coolidge had only served a little less than half of Harding's unexpired term before winning election in his own right. Nevertheless, some believe that Coolidge was honoring the two-term tradition set by President George Washington, even though Coolidge held the opinion that a vice president who succeeded to part of another president's term would not violate the rule by then running twice for election in his own right. Nevertheless, and notwithstanding his actual reasons for not running, Coolidge continued the tradition.

Ratification of the Twenty-second Amendment limited the number of times that a person can be elected president to two. Moreover, it further reduced that limit to one in the case of those who had previously served more than half of the unexpired presidential term of another President, which incidentally would not have applied to Coolidge had the Amendment been in force during his presidency, since Coolidge served less than two years of Harding's term. The Amendment has yet to apply to anyone succeeding to the presidency – a grandfather clause exempted Harry S. Truman once the amendment came into force, Lyndon B. Johnson served less than half of John F. Kennedy's term when he became president after Kennedy's assassination and Gerald R. Ford (who did serve more than half of Richard Nixon's second term) was defeated in his bid to win election to a full term. Moreover, both Truman and Johnson initially attempted to run for re-election to a second full four-year term, only for both to abandon their respective runs for the presidency after each made a disappointing showing in the New Hampshire primary.

Popular culture
 
The phrase entered popular culture of the era. The tune "I Do Not Choose to Run", credited to Kenny & Dennis was recorded in March 1928 by Harry Reser's jazz band for Brunswick Records. The humorous lyrics tell the story of a watch which, rather than ticking and telling time, utters Coolidge's famous phrase.

A 1966 episode of The Dick Van Dyke Show is titled "I Do Not Choose to Run". In the episode, Rob Petrie chooses not to run for city council.

References

Bibliography
 
 
 

Political quotes
Presidency of Calvin Coolidge
1928 United States presidential election
1920s neologisms